LUV is a 2012 crime drama film directed by Sheldon Candis. It was nominated for the Grand Jury Prize at the 2012 Sundance Film Festival. LUV was shot in and around Baltimore, Maryland, and had its Baltimore premiere at the Maryland Film Festival 2012. It was later released in theaters on January 18, 2013. The film has received mixed reviews from critics.

Plot
The film begins with Woody Watson (Michael Rainey Jr.) having a dream about him and his mother in the woods, but he then wakes up. Woody lives with his grandmother (Lonette McKee) in the inner city of Baltimore and longs to be reunited with his mother, who is in rehab in North Carolina. His charismatic Uncle Vincent (Common) has recently returned home after being sentenced to 20 years in prison, with his sentenced reduced to 12. He is released after serving 8 years. He is determined to straighten out his life by opening a high-end crab shack. Vincent drops Woody off at school, but when Woody becomes embarrassed when a girl looks at him, Vincent decides to give the boy a tutorial on how to become a man.

After a trip to a tailor to get Woody a custom-fitted suit, the duo take a trip to see Cofield (Charles S. Dutton), Vincent's friend and old crime partner who now owns his own crab shack and informs Vincent that Mr. Fish (Dennis Haysbert), his old crime boss, is looking for him. The pair heads to the bank to sign off on the loan Vincent needs to fulfill his dreams. His bank officer tells him that he needs $22,000 so Vincent can start his business. Vincent has no one to turn to for help but his former associates, including Baltimore crime boss Mr. Fish and his brother Arthur (Danny Glover). Vincent takes a desperate turn when Fish enlists Vincent for one more drug deal to demonstrate his loyalty.

The pair then start going around town to finish the deal. Vincent then teaches Woody how to drive, then how to fire a gun. The pair then go to Jamison's place to arrange a deal. Eventually, Jamison and Vincent fight each other; Vincent tells Woody to fire his gun, but Woody freezes up, forcing Vincent to kill Jamison himself. Later while driving, Vincent, enraged at Woody, yells at him and the two get in an argument.

During the argument, Vincent yells at Woody how his mother doesn't want him. This enrages Woody, which leads him to abandon the car. Woody runs to the train station to catch a ride to North Carolina, but is stopped by Vincent. Woody decides to go home, but Vincent tells him "we ain't got no home." Vincent then convinces Woody to help him with the deal and promises to take him to North Carolina one day.

Woody and Vincent then meet up with Cofield again at the lake. The pair have to go to a drug dealer, Enoch, next, but Cofield believes it's too risky. But Woody comes up with a plan about Enoch not noticing them. The pair then go to Enoch. Enoch's henchmen surround the pair, but the deal goes out as planned and the pair leave. The pair then go to visit Beverly (Meagan Good), Vincent's old girlfriend who is pregnant and has a new boyfriend. Enraged by this, Vincent beats up her boyfriend and drives off with Woody.

The pair then meet Fish and Arthur at their mansion for dinner. However, later on, things take a turn for the worse. Vincent becomes mad at Fish due to the fact that his last drug deal got Vincent locked up. Vincent then pulls out his gun, hits Arthur with it, and aims it at Fish. Fish then reveals that Vincent was the one that got Woody's mother on drugs. This angers Woody, who pulls out a gun and aims it at Vincent. Arthur then grabs a rifle and shoots Vincent, who counteracts by shooting and killing Arthur. Woody grabs his backpack and runs outside just as Vincent kills Fish.

Woody runs into the woods with a critically wounded Vincent right behind him; Woody then discovers him. As the two walk off, Vincent falls over and dies in Woody's arms. Woody cries just as the police arrives. Woody is taken into custody by Detectives Holloway and Pratt (Michael K. Williams & Russell Hornsby) where Woody finds himself involved in a triple homicide, but won't be charged. As Holloway drives Woody home, he tells Woody that he will be brought in for questioning along with his grandmother at 10:00 tomorrow morning.

The next morning before 10:00, Woody takes a cab to the crime scene. He makes his way into the woods, where a flashback reveals that he buried some money made from the drug deal under a tree. Woody takes the money and drives off in Vincent's car, symbolizing that Woody has decided to become his own man. Back at home, his grandmother walks into the kitchen where she finds money left by Woody in her Bible. As Woody drives off (presumably to North Carolina), in voice-over form, Woody says "My Uncle Vincent said that they are two types of people: owners and renters. But the real question is, what will you own?" As Woody has another vision of him and his mother in the woods, the movie ends with Woody becoming emotional.

Cast
 Common as Vincent
 Michael Rainey Jr. as Woody Watson
 Dennis Haysbert as Mr. Fish
 Danny Glover as Arthur
 Lonette McKee as Grandma
 Charles S. Dutton as Cofield
 Meagan Good as Beverly
 Marz Lovejoy as Angel
 Marc John Jefferies as Newt
 Michael K. Williams as Detective Holloway
 Tracey Heggins as Leslie
 Clark Johnson as Harold Barnes
 Russell Hornsby as Detective Pratt
 Sammi Rotibi as Jamison

Reception
On review aggregator website Rotten Tomatoes, the film holds an approval rating of 34% based on 41 reviews, with an average rating of 5.2/10. On Metacritic, the film has a weighted average score of 52 out of 100, based on 21 critics, indicating "mixed or average reviews".

Owen Gleiberman of Entertainment Weekly gave the film a C−, writing, "The actor and rapper Common has become a highly skilled screen star, but this touchy-feely dud does him wrong... The first sign that something is off in the movie is when Vincent decides to give his kid nephew (Michael Rainey Jr.) a lesson in thug life. The second is that the director, Sheldon Candis, can't decide if that's a good thing. No wonder every scene wobbles around."

See also 
 List of hood films

References

External links
 

2012 films
2012 crime drama films
American coming-of-age drama films
American action drama films
2010s English-language films
Films set in Baltimore
Films shot in Baltimore
Hood films
American independent films
2012 independent films
2010s American films